Klaus Teuber (born June 25, 1952) is a German former dental technician and designer of board games. He is best known for designing the strategy board game Catan.

Career
Teuber won the Spiel des Jahres ("Game of the Year") award four times: for The Settlers of Catan, Barbarossa, Drunter und Drüber and Adel Verpflichtet. By Hook or Crook by Teuber was published in the American market by Avalon Hill in 1991, making it an early German style board game import.

Personal life
Teuber retired from his profession as a dental technician to become a full-time game designer in 1999.  , he lives in Roßdorf with his wife Claudia. They have two sons, Guido and Benny.

Games

 The Settlers of Catan (and its many expansions, as well as the video game version, Catan)
 The Settlers of Canaan, a legally licensed and biblically-oriented version of Catan. It is not clear whether Teuber or someone else developed this edition.
 Löwenherz or Domaine
 Entdecker
 Drunter und Drüber
 Adel Verpflichtet (var.: Hoity Toity, Hook or Crook, Fair Means or Foul)
 Barbarossa
 Timberland, a German-style board game based on woodland management that came in ninth in the Deutscher Spiele Preis (German Game Prize).
 Pop Belly Pigs

See also
 Going Cardboard, (documentary; includes an interview with Teuber)
 List of Klaus Teuber games

References

External links
 "Special K", article on Klaus Teuber's impact on the game industry
 "Monopoly Killer: Perfect German Board Game Redefines Genre", article on the process through which Klaus Teuber refined Settlers of Catan

Board game designers
1952 births
Living people
Klaus Teuber games